A Princess for Christmas, billed in the UK as A Christmas Princess: Sometimes Dreams Come True (previously known as the Canadian title Christmas at Castlebury Hall and A Princess for Castlebury) is a 2011 American made-for-television comedy-drama film directed by Michael Damian and starring Roger Moore, Katie McGrath, Sam Heughan, Charlotte Salt, Leilah de Meza, and Travis Turner. The film premiered December 3, 2011 on Hallmark Channel.

Plot
Jules Daly is an antique store worker in Buffalo, New York who becomes the legal guardian of her niece Maddie and nephew Milo after the loss of her sister and brother-in-law. Maddie is a fun-loving girl and Milo is a rebel and troublemaking teenager. After Jules gets fired by Arthur due to financial problems and the children's babysitter Mrs. Kelly quits following Maddie's pranks, Jules reprimands Maddie for driving the nanny away and grounds Milo for sneaking out, shoplifting a game, and decapitating Maddie's doll to keep her quiet. In addition, Milo doesn't want to go get a Christmas tree with Jules due to the fact that Christmas reminds him of his parents' death.

Paisley Winterbottom the butler of the children's wealthy grandfather, Duke Edward appears with an invitation for Milo and Maddie to spend the Christmas holidays with his employer in the country of Castlebury. Jules initially refuses, but decides to go for the children's sake when Paisley claims that the Duke is ill.

Arriving at the palace where the Duke is in good health, Jules meets Prince Ashton, the brother of her sister's husband Charles and falls in love with him. Looking around, she finds no Christmas trees and asks the Duke why there are none. He replies he doesn't like them. However, Jules takes Maddie out to get a tree and then they all decorate it. Edward finds out and becomes furious until Maddie hands him an ornament, which turns out to be the same one his brother had given him when they were children. Finally appreciating the spirit of the season, he tells Paisley to send invitations out for a Christmas Eve ball.

While teaching Milo archery, Ashton talks about his brother Charles and how the Duke disowned him for marrying Jules' sister which led to Jules' resentment towards the Duke. Maddie manages to warm her grandfather's warm heart enough to get him to change his opinion towards Christmas.

Overhearing Ashton and Edward speaking disapprovingly of someone "untitled" and "crass" they'd rather not invite to the ball, Jules mistakenly believes it to be about her, though they are actually talking about someone else.

When the staff accidentally burns Jules' dress, she takes this as an excuse not to attend. Jules, feeling unwelcome, decides to go back to the USA early only telling the children. Despite their efforts to make her stay, she leaves, asking them not to tell anyone until she is gone. The housekeeper Mrs. Birch finds that Jules is missing. So she and Paisley lead some members of the staff to retrieve her. They pick her up the train station while also having a dress brought in from Vienna.

Meanwhile at the ball, Ashton verifies his girlfriend, Lady Arabella, only wants him for his title. Jules arrives at the ball. When Ashton finds her, she says she is trying to not be an embarrassment. Confused, he asks for an explanation. After Jules explains her eavesdropping, Ashton clears things up, noting that the woman they called an "awful grizzly woman" was Bunny McCracken, who hates children. They then dance. Arabella and her parents unsuccessfully attempt to turn Edward and Ashton against Jules, then storm out. Ashton asks Jules to extend their stay and she agrees.

The family then "catches" Santa putting gifts under the Christmas tree. Sometime later, Jules and Ashton are married, and their friends and family watch as they ride off in a coach together.

Cast
 Roger Moore as Edward, the Duke of Castlebury.
 Katie McGrath as Jules Daly
 Sam Heughan as Prince Ashton, the prince of Castlebury and Edward's son.
 Charlotte Salt as Lady Arabella Marchand du Belmont, Prince Ashton's girlfriend.
 Leilah de Meza as Maddie Huntington, Jules' niece.
 Travis Turner as Milo Huntington, Jules' nephew.
 Miles Richardson as Paisley Winterbottom, Edward's butler.
 Maria Junghietu as Mrs. Kelly, Milo and Maddy's former babysitter.
 Oxana Moravic as Mrs Birch, Edward's housekeeper.
 Madalina Anea as Abigail, a housemaid who works for Edward.
 Florin Busuioc as Lord du Belmont, Lady Arabella's father.
 Anca Varlan as Bunny McCracken, a grizzly woman who hates children.
 Michael Damian as Arthur (uncredited), the owner of the antique store who fires Jules due to financial troubles.

Production
In August 2008, writer and director Michael Damian told OK Magazine that he was "working on a screenplay called Christmas At Castlebury Hall".
The film was shot at Peleş Castle, Stirbei Castle, the Bragadiru Palace and at MediaPro Studios in Bucharest, Romania February and March 2011. The film's cinematographer is Viorel Sergovici.On July 16, Michael Damian announced the film's new name: A Princess for Christmas.

Accolades 

|+ Movieguide Awards – A Princess for Christmas
|-
| 2011
| Most Inspirational Television Acting
| Grace Award: Sam Heughan
| 
|-
| 2011
| Most Inspirational Television Acting
| Grace Award: Katie McGrath
| 
|}

See also
 List of Christmas films

References

External links
 
 
 

2011 television films
2011 films
Films shot in Romania
American Christmas comedy-drama films
2010s Christmas comedy-drama films
Hallmark Channel original films
Films directed by Michael Damian
American drama television films
2010s English-language films
2010s American films
Films about princes